Side Street Ramblers is a Dallas-based Barbershop quartet that won the 1983 SPEBSQSA international competition in Seattle.

Discography
 Seems Like Yesterday LP, cassette
 Side Street Ramblers LP, cassette
 Encore!, CD

They also appear on Here's to The Winners (LP, cassette, 8-track) with the Vocal Majority.

External links
 Discography and biography from Primarily A Cappella
 Discography from Mike Barkley's Monster list
 AIC entry

Barbershop quartets
Barbershop Harmony Society